This is a list of alleged sightings of unidentified flying objects or UFOs in Sweden.

1946 

 Ghost Rockets is the name given to mysterious rocket or missile shaped objects which were sighted on many occasions between May and December 1946, with peaks on 9 and 11 August 1946. They were seen primarily in Sweden and nearby Scandinavian countries, but also in other European countries as well. Some 2000 reported sightings were logged altogether, 200 of them being on radar, and a number of fragments were reported found by military authorities.

2009

 The 2009 Norwegian spiral anomaly was a spiral event that occurred over Norway and Sweden. The spiral consisted of a blue beam of light with a greyish spiral emanating from one end of it. The anomaly was seen in the northern areas of the country.

See also 
 List of reported UFO sightings

References

External links 
 MUFON - Last 20 UFO Sightings and Pictures

Sweden
Historical events in Sweden